Greve may refer to:

Places
 Greve (surname), includes a list of people with the name
 Grevë, a village in Albania
 Greve in Chianti, a town in Tuscany, Italy, at the center of the Chianti wine region
 Greve Lake, Chile
 Greve Municipality, a municipality in Region Sjælland on the island of Zealand, Denmark
 Greve Strand, the municipal seat of Greve
 Greve station, one of the railway stations in the Danish municipality
 Place de Greve, former name of Place de l'Hôtel-de-Ville, Paris, France

Other uses 
 Grevé, a Swedish cow's milk cheese
 Greve Fodbold, a Danish football club
 Greve Graphics, a defunct Swedish video game developer

See also
 Greave (or greve), a piece of armour that protects the leg
 Greeves (disambiguation)
 Greve, Buhrlage, and Company (disambiguation)
 Grieve (disambiguation)